The Cloudbreak mine is an iron ore mine located in the Pilbara region of Western Australia, 89 kilometres west-south-west of Nullagine, in the Chichester Range.

The mine is fully owned and operated by the Fortescue Metals Group (FMG) and is one of four iron ore mines the company operates in the Pilbara, the others being Christmas Creek mine (located 50 kilometres east of Cloudbreak) and the Kings Valley mine and Firetail mine at the Solomon Project.

FMG is the third-largest iron ore mining company in the Pilbara, behind Rio Tinto and BHP.

The mine is situated within the boundaries of Mulga Downs Station which is currently owned by Gina Rinehart.

Overview

FMG acquired the Cloudbreak and Christmas Creek tenements during 2003. The company begun constructing port facilities at Port Hedland in February 2006, followed by a $3.2 billion capital raising in August 2006 to finance its projects. Construction on the mine itself began in October 2006.

Fortescue began mining at Cloudbreak in October 2007. Iron ore production at the mine began in 2008 and, in its first full year of operation, the mine produced 28 million tonnes of iron ore.

The ore from the mine is processed on site before being loaded onto rail. The product is then transported to the coast at Port Hedland via the Fortescue railway, where it is loaded onto ships. Construction on the 280 kilometre long line from Cloudbreak to the Herb Elliott Port at Port Hedland was begun in November 2006. The line was scheduled to be fully operational within 18 months. A cyclone in March 2007 killed two workers at the project and lead to delays. The first train from the mine to the port travelled on 5 April 2008.

The mine's workforce is on a fly-in fly-out roster. FIFO arrivals and departures take place at Fortescue Dave Forrest Airport, which is approximately five kilometres away.

The hubs' (Cloudbreak and Chichester combined) annual production rate, as of January 2013, is 90 million tonnes of iron ore. Instead, Fortescue decided to develop its Christmas Creek deposit, at a cost of US$360 million, by building a mine and process plant there and linking it to its existing rail network. Christmas Creek is scheduled to produce 16 million tonnes of iron ore in its first year of operation. Fortescue plans to reach an annual production of 95 million tonnes of iron ore by 2012, downgraded from an earlier target of 120 million.

Mining at Cloudbreak was temporarily suspended on 24 December 2010 after a fatality as a sign of respect and to ensure the safety of the workers.
 
Approximately 1,500 workers at the mine had to be evacuated in October 2013 after a large bushfire threatened the accommodation village near the mine. The workers were taken to Christmas Creek mine until the danger had passed. No injuries or damage was caused to the minesite by the fire which was eventually contained.

Environmental approval
The approval of the A$2 billion project through the then-Minister for the Environment, Ian Campbell, was criticised because of a number of endangered species in the area of the future mine, among them the incredibly rare night parrot. Continuation of the mining project was endangered and, in order to gain EPA approval, the mine had to implement a management plan to ensure that mining activities would not have a negative effect on the species survival in the area. The occurrence of the night parrot in the future mining area was discovered during a 2005 survey, at Minga Well on 12 April 2005, commissioned by FMG, which was carried out by two contract biologists who sighted a small group of the birds. Unconfirmed sightings of the bird had been made previously in a nearby area in 2004.

References

External links 
 MINEDEX website: East Pilbara Iron Ore / FMG Database of the Department of Mines, Industry Regulation and Safety

Iron ore mines in Western Australia
Surface mines in Australia
Shire of Ashburton
Fortescue Metals Group
2008 establishments in Australia